Shane Lowry (born 2 April 1987) is an Irish professional golfer who plays on the European Tour and the PGA Tour. His notable achievements include winning the 2019 Open Championship, the Irish Open as an amateur in 2009, and the 2015 WGC-Bridgestone Invitational.

Early life
Born in the Midlands Regional Hospital, Mullingar, County Westmeath, Republic of Ireland, Lowry grew up in Clara, County Offaly. He is the son of Brendan Lowry, who won the 1982 All-Ireland Senior Football Championship Final with Offaly. Shane Lowry maintained his links with Offaly as his golfing career advanced, saying in 2021: "But any time I get the chance to go to O'Connor Park and watch Offaly play, I do and I am the first to give out if they lose and I am sitting in the stand."

Lowry learned his early golf at Esker Hills Golf Club, where he began his amateur career. He attended Athlone Institute of Technology as a scholarship student on the Higher Certificate in Sport and Recreation.

Amateur career

Lowry was the 2007 Irish Amateur Close Champion, defeating Niall Turner 4 and 3 in the final. 

Lowry was part of the Irish teams, combined from the Republic of Ireland and Northern Ireland, winning the European Amateur Team Championship in 2007 and 2008, on the first occasion in the same team as Rory McIlroy.

While still an amateur in May 2009, he won The Irish Open at County Louth Golf Club on the European Tour, defeating Robert Rock on the third hole of a sudden death playoff. The win, on his tour debut, made him just the third amateur to win on the European Tour, following Danny Lee earlier in the 2009 season, and Pablo Martín in 2007. Lowry shot a 62 to equal the lowest ever by an amateur on the circuit and led from the second round onwards.

With this win, he entered the Official World Golf Ranking as an amateur at No. 168 and reached a career high of sixth in the World Amateur Golf Ranking. Walker Cup captain Colin Dagleish described the win as "fairytale stuff", adding: "You'd have to say that Shane's victory was the biggest (of the three amateur wins). To win your own national Open is quite something. It was unbelievable, it really was." The win was only the second home victory since 1982 and the first since Pádraig Harrington in 2007. Harrington himself was also full of praise: "It's fabulous for Irish golf. You only have to look at the fact it is such a rarity for an amateur to win, such a rarity for an Irish player to win the Irish Open. So, on a lot of fronts, it is a big deal. It was very impressive."

Professional career
Lowry elected to turn professional the week after his Irish Open triumph, meaning that he would miss out on the opportunity to play in the Walker Cup in September 2009. He made his professional début on 28 May at the European Open, where he shot 78 in the first round to end the opening day almost at the back of the field, and went on to miss the cut following a second round 73.

Lowry missed the first three cuts of his professional career, but had his first payday on 5 July, when he finished 50th at the Open de France Alstom. He had his best professional result in 2009 in November, when he finished 3rd in the Dunlop Phoenix Tournament in Japan. In January 2010, Lowry finished in fourth place in the Abu Dhabi Golf Championship, moving him into the top-100 of the Official World Golf Ranking.

In June 2010, Lowry qualified for his first major championship, the Open Championship at St Andrews. During the qualification, Lowry equalled Nick Faldo's course record at Sunningdale when he posted a 62. Lowry went on to make the cut at St Andrews and eventually finished in a tie for 37th place.

Lowry won for the first time as a professional in 2012, at the Portugal Masters in October. He shot a 67 to tie for the lead with the Englishman Ross Fisher, who made bogey on the final hole after missing a four-foot putt. The victory lifted Lowry back into the Official World Golf Ranking top 100 and made him eligible to compete in the WGC-HSBC Champions.

In 2014, Lowry was runner-up at the BMW PGA Championship in May and later tied for ninth at the Open Championship at Royal Liverpool (Hoylake), his best finish at a major.

In August 2015, Lowry won the WGC-Bridgestone Invitational in the United States at Firestone in Akron, Ohio, two strokes ahead of runner-up Bubba Watson. Lowry accepted PGA Tour membership for the 2015–16 season.

At the 2016 U.S. Open at Oakmont Country Club near Pittsburgh, Lowry shot 65 (−5) in the third round for 203 (−7) and a four-stroke advantage over Dustin Johnson and Andrew Landry at the 54-hole stage. The 65 was Lowry's joint career best round at a major championship. Due to weather delays on Thursday, the third round was not completed until early on Sunday, and Lowry birdied two of his remaining four holes to extend his two stroke overnight lead to four. In the final round he was in contention for the title, within one shot of Dustin Johnson after 12 holes, before three consecutive bogeys on holes 14, 15 and 16 ended his chances. He finished the tournament tied for second place, with a final round score of 76.

Lowry did not win on the European Tour from 2016 to 2018 but was joint runner-up in the 2017 DP World Tour Championship, Dubai and runner-up in the 2018 Andalucía Valderrama Masters.

Lowry started the 2018–19 season with partial status after finishing 140th in the FedEx Cup.

2019: Open Championship victory
In January 2019, Lowry won the Abu Dhabi HSBC Championship by one shot over Richard Sterne. He led by 3 strokes after three rounds but was two-over-par after 11 holes of his final round and dropped 4 shots behind Sterne. However he finished with 3 birdies in the final 7 holes, while Sterne had two bogeys, giving Lowry the victory.

In July, He moved into a share of the 36-hole lead at the 2019 Open Championship at Royal Portrush, after successive opening rounds of 67. He was tied at eight under with J. B. Holmes. Lowry then shot a 63 for a new course record to lead by four strokes at the end of the third round. He won the tournament by six shots ahead of Tommy Fleetwood. Lowry held the Claret Jug for two years due to the COVID-19 pandemic postponing the 2020 edition of the Open Championship.

2021–2022: First Ryder Cup and continued success
In September 2021, Lowry played on the European team in the 2021 Ryder Cup at Whistling Straits in Kohler, Wisconsin. The U.S. team won 19–9 and Lowry went 1–2–0 including a loss in his Sunday singles match against Patrick Cantlay.

In February 2022, Lowry finished runner-up at The Honda Classic. Sepp Straka birdied the final hole to finish one shot ahead of him. In April, Lowry held the lead during the final round of the RBC Heritage, however a double-bogey on the back nine, saw him finish one shot short of the playoff between Patrick Cantlay and Jordan Spieth. In September, Lowry won the BMW PGA Championship at the Wentworth Club. He shot a final-round 65 after the event had been shortened to 54 holes. He beat Rory McIlroy and Jon Rahm (who shot a 62 in the final round) by one stroke for his sixth European Tour victory.

Personal life
Lowry married Wendy Honner in 2016 and has two daughters.

During tournaments he often wears black and white clothes, which are the same colours as his hometown's Gaelic sports club.

Lowry announced a five-year partnership with Offaly GAA in April 2021.

Lowry is a lifelong supporter of Manchester United.

Amateur wins
2007 Irish Amateur Close Championship
2008 West of Ireland Championship, North of Ireland Championship, Mullingar Scratch Cup
2009 Lee Valley Senior Scratch Cup

Professional wins (6)

PGA Tour wins (2)

European Tour wins (6)

*Note: The 2022 BMW PGA Championship was shortened to 54 holes due to Operation London Bridge.

European Tour playoff record (1–0)

Major championships

Wins (1)

Results timeline
Results not in chronological order in 2020.

CUT = missed the half way cut
"T" = tied
NT = No tournament due to COVID-19 pandemic

Summary

Most consecutive cuts made – 12 (2019 PGA – 2022 PGA)
Longest streak of top-10s – 1 (seven times)

Results in The Players Championship

CUT = missed the half-way cut
"T" indicates a tie for a place
C = Cancelled after the first round due to the COVID-19 pandemic

World Golf Championships

Wins (1)

Results timeline
Results not in chronological order before 2015.

1Cancelled due to COVID-19 pandemic

QF, R16, R32, R64 = Round in which player lost in match play
NT = no tournament
"T" = tied
Note that the Championship and Invitational were discontinued from 2022.

Team appearances
Amateur
European Boys' Team Championship (representing Ireland): 2005
European Youths' Team Championship (representing Ireland): 2006
European Amateur Team Championship (representing Ireland): 2007 (winners), 2008 (winners)
St Andrews Trophy (representing Great Britain & Ireland): 2008 (winners)
Eisenhower Trophy (representing Ireland): 2008
Bonallack Trophy (representing Europe): 2008 (winners)

Professional
World Cup (representing Ireland): 2013, 2016, 2018
EurAsia Cup (representing Europe): 2016 (winners)
Ryder Cup (representing Europe): 2021
Hero Cup (representing Great Britain & Ireland): 2023

References

External links
 
 
 
 Shane Lowry at ESPN
 
 
 

Irish male golfers
European Tour golfers
PGA Tour golfers
Winners of men's major golf championships
Olympic golfers of Ireland
Golfers at the 2020 Summer Olympics
Alumni of Athlone Institute of Technology
Sportspeople from County Offaly
Sportspeople from County Westmeath
People from Mullingar
Shane
1987 births
Living people